The following is a list of freeware software packages and applications for use in the health industry:

Imaging

 Ambivu 3D Workstation, PC and Mac fast DICOM 3D/2D workstation
 BioDigital
 Ginkgo CADx, cross-platform open source DICOM viewer
 IrfanView, an image viewer for Windows with DICOM support
 MicroDicom, DICOM viewer for Windows
 VistA imaging, public domain fully integrated PACS, image, and scanned document information system. Incorporates proprietary modules not available outside the VA

Practice management
GaiaEHR
GNUmed
OpenEMR
OpenMRS

See also
eHealth
Health Informatics
List of open-source bioinformatics software

References

Freeware
Freeware
 
Lists of software